Česnečka is a garlic soup in Czech cuisine and Slovak cuisine consisting of a thin broth, garlic, sliced potatoes and spices such as caraway, marjoram and cumin. A significant amount of garlic is typically used, and it is typically served with fried bread cubes. Additional ingredients sometimes used include lard or butter and grated cheese. It is usually prepared without any meat.

History
Česnečka was sometimes consumed by poor farmhands in the Czech Republic in the 1910s.

See also

 List of garlic dishes
 List of soups

References

External links
 

Czech cuisine
Garlic dishes
Slovak cuisine
Vegetable soups